Bucculatrix hamaboella is a moth in the family Bucculatricidae. It was described by Shigeki Kobayashi, Toshiya Hirowatari and Hiroshi Kuroko in 2009. It is found in Japan (Honshu).

The forewings are creamy white, mixed with dark brown.

The larvae feed on Hibiscus hamabo. They mine the leaves of their host plant. The young larvae form a long red linear mine. Older larvae bore the stem of their host plant.

References

Natural History Museum Lepidoptera generic names catalog

Bucculatricidae
Moths described in 2009
Moths of Japan